Vânia Abreu is a singer and performer from Brazil. She was born on May 30, 1967 as Vânia Mercury de Almeida. She is the younger sister of Daniela Mercury, a chart-topping singer in Música popular brasileira (Brazilian popular music). She and her sister performed in local nightclubs, bars, and other venues in their teen years in order to achieve their start as singers.

Abreu began her professional performances in 1986 as a backup singer for the band Gerônimo in Salvador, Brazil. In 1994, she was a member of the band, Biss. The next year, she released her self-titled album, Vania Abreu. Her most critically acclaimed album to date is Seio da Bahia, on which she sings classic songs from the Brazilian state, Bahia.

Discography
Vania Abreu [1995]
Pra Mim [1996]
Seio Da Baia [1999]
Eu Sou a Multidão [2003]
Pierrot & Colombina - (with Marcelo Quintanilha) [2006]
Misteriosa Dona Esperança [2007]

References

External links 
Vania Abreu's Dicionario MPB page

1967 births
Living people
20th-century Brazilian women singers
20th-century Brazilian singers
21st-century Brazilian women singers
21st-century Brazilian singers
Brazilian people of Italian descent
Brazilian people of Portuguese descent
People from Salvador, Bahia